Eric Moten (born April 11, 1968) is an American former professional football player who was an offensive guard in the National Football League (NFL). He played five years for the San Diego Chargers and was their starting left guard for four of those years. He played college football for the Michigan State Spartans.

References

1968 births
Living people
American football offensive guards
Michigan State Spartans football players
San Diego Chargers players
Ed Block Courage Award recipients
Players of American football from Cleveland